The 1999 San Diego Padres season was the 31st season in franchise history. They finished fourth in the National League West. They had lost several key players after their 1998 pennant-winning season, most notably pitching ace Kevin Brown.

Offseason

Acquisitions
November 13, 1998: John Vander Wal was signed as a free agent with the San Diego Padres.
November 17, 1998: Archi Cianfrocco was released by the San Diego Padres.
February 2, 1999: Mark Sweeney was traded by the San Diego Padres with Greg Vaughn to the Cincinnati Reds for Damian Jackson, Reggie Sanders, and Josh Harris (minors).
Starting pitcher Joey Hamilton traded to the Toronto Blue Jays for starting pitchers Woody Williams and reliever Carlos Almanzar

Free agent losses
Kevin Brown
Ken Caminiti
Steve Finley

Regular season
The Padres played in the first game ever at Safeco Field on July 15, 1999. The Mariners lost to the Padres by a score of 3 to 2. It was the first park in Major League history to host an interleague game on its inaugural day.

Opening Day starters
George Arias
Andy Ashby
Chris Gomez
Tony Gwynn
Wally Joyner
Greg Myers
Rubén Rivera
Reggie Sanders
Quilvio Veras

Season standings

Record vs. opponents

Notable transactions
 July 31, 1999: Jim Leyritz was traded by the San Diego Padres to the New York Yankees for Geraldo Padua (minors).

Roster

Tony Gwynn's 3000th Hit
 August 6, 1999: Tony Gwynn of the San Diego Padres got the 3,000th hit of his career. After the hit, first base umpire Kerwin Danley personally congratulated Tony Gwynn after the hit because they were teammates at San Diego State. Gwynn had four singles in the game. Gwynn became the twenty-second member of the three-thousand hit club and accomplished the feat on his mother's birthday.

Line Score
August 6, Olympic Stadium, Montréal, Québec

Batting

Pitching

Player stats

Batting

Starters by position
Note: Pos = Position; G = Games played; AB = At bats; H = Hits; Avg. = Batting average; HR = Home runs; RBI = Runs batted in

Other batters
Note: G = Games played; AB = At bats; H = Hits; Avg. = Batting average; HR = Home runs; RBI = Runs batted in

Pitching

Starting pitchers 
Note: G = Games pitched; IP = Innings pitched; W = Wins; L = Losses; ERA = Earned run average; SO = Strikeouts

Other pitchers 
Note: G = Games pitched; IP = Innings pitched; W = Wins; L = Losses; ERA = Earned run average; SO = Strikeouts

Relief pitchers 
Note: G = Games pitched; W = Wins; L = Losses; SV = Saves; ERA = Earned run average; SO = Strikeouts

Award winners
 Tony Gwynn, Outfield, Roberto Clemente Award
1999 Major League Baseball All-Star Game
 Tony Gwynn
 Andy Ashby
 Trevor Hoffman

Farm system

References

External links
 1999 San Diego Padres at Baseball Reference
 1999 San Diego Padres at Baseball Almanac
 

San Diego Padres seasons
San Diego Padres season
San Diego Padres